Divorce Wars: A Love Story (also known simply as Divorce Wars) is a 1982 American made-for-television drama film written, directed and produced by Donald Wrye. It was originally broadcast March 1, 1982 on ABC.  It was the seventh most-watched show for the week of March 1–7, 1982.

Cast
Tom Selleck as Jack Sturgess 
Jane Curtin as Vickey Sturgess
Candice Azzara as Sylvia Bemous 
Joan Bennett as Adele Burgess
Maggie Cooper as Leslie Fields
Charles Haid as Fred Bemous
Viveca Lindfors as Barbara Harper
Philip Sterling as Max Bernheimer
Dorothy Fielding as Cleo
Mimi Rogers as Belinda Wittiker
Joe Regalbuto as Barry Fields
Alan Oppenheimer as Arthur Lazar
Clare Torao as Donna (credited as Clare Nono)

References

External links

1982 television films
1982 films
1982 drama films
1980s English-language films
Films directed by Donald Wrye
Works about divorce
Warner Bros. films
American drama television films
1980s American films